Michael A. Walker is an English film and television screenwriter. Winner and nominee of over 15 awards for his produced work, he has written on several major television series, such as Devils, Collision, The Swarm, and Young Wallander.

Career
In 1999 his first written feature, The Fall, was released, starring Craig Sheffer. His short film Does God Play Football starring Kevin McKidd and Helen McCrory won the crystal Bear at Berlinale Film Festival 2005 and went on to win or be nominated for a further nine awards.

In 2009, Walker co-wrote with Anthony Horowitz the five-part hit ITV drama, Collision. He would later work on Jed Mercurio's medical drama Critical in 2015 and in 2019, wrote and executive produced on Devils, a Sky Italia banking thriller series, starring Patrick Dempsey, based on the novel by Guido Maria Brera. Walker wrote Season 2 of Young Wallander for Netflix. He co-wrote an adaptation of Frank Schätzing's novel, The Swarm for Intaglio Films and ZDF, executive produced by Frank Doelger. It will air in 2023.

On 23 November 2020 it was announced that Legendary Entertainment and Watford & Essex are developing a new version of Voyage to The Bottom Of The Sea. Walker and Chris Lunt are writing the project. He and Lunt are currently developing an adaptation of The Time Machine.

In 2023, Walker wrote the script of German TV series The Swarm with Steven Lally, Marissa Lestrade and Chris Lunt. It is an adaptation of eponymous novel by Frank Schätzing.

References

External links
Official Website
 

Living people
British television writers
English screenwriters
English male screenwriters
English television writers
British male television writers
Year of birth missing (living people)